Antoine Ridgeway Ivins (May 11, 1881 – October 18, 1967) was a member of the First Council of the Seventy of the Church of Jesus Christ of Latter-day Saints from 1931 until his death.

Youth and family 
Ivins was born in St. George, Utah Territory. Ivins spent some of his younger years in Mexico. Ivins was the son of Anthony W. Ivins, an LDS apostle and counselor in the First Presidency. His mother was Elizabeth Ashby Snow Ivins, the daughter of LDS Apostle Erastus Snow.

Ivins studied law in Mexico City. He also studied at the University of Michigan and the University of Utah. Ivins received a degree from the University of Utah.

In 1912, Ivins married Vilate Ellen Romney. Following his wife Vilate's death in 1964, Ivins married Edna Robbins.

Church service 

From 1921 to 1931 Ivins managed the LDS Church's sugar cane plantation in Laie, Hawaii.

From 1931 until 1933 Ivins was the president of the Mexican Mission of the LDS Church. He succeeded Rey L. Pratt in this position. At this time, the mission not only had responsibility for all of Mexico, but also for all proselytizing efforts among the Spanish-speaking populations of the Southwest United States. Ivins performed the first translation of the temple endowment into a language other than English: in cooperation with Eduardo Balderas, he translated it into Spanish.

During the 1930s, after his return from serving as president of the Mexican Mission, Ivins worked on translating the Doctrine and Covenants and the Pearl of Great Price into Spanish.

From 1931 until his death, Ivins was a member of the First Council of the Seventy. He was the presiding member of the Council from 1963. He also served as a member of the General Welfare Advisory Committee of the Church.

Notes

External links
Grampa Bill's G.A. Pages: Antoine R. Ivins

1881 births
1967 deaths
20th-century Mormon missionaries
American general authorities (LDS Church)
American Mormon missionaries in Mexico
American Mormon missionaries in the United States
Burials at Salt Lake City Cemetery
English–Spanish translators
Mission presidents (LDS Church)
People from St. George, Utah
Presidents of the Seventy (LDS Church)
University of Michigan alumni
University of Utah alumni
20th-century translators
American expatriates in Mexico
Missionary linguists